Genesee Abbey is a monastery in Piffard, Livingston County, New York. The monks are members of the Order of Cistercians of the Strict Observance, commonly known as Trappists.

The abbey is surrounded by 2,500 acres of field and forest.

Bread
The monks have been baking bread for over 65 years. Called "Monks' Breads", they are made in a large bakery near living quarters of the monks on the grounds of the abbey. Originally, the bakery was staffed entirely by monks. In more recent years, laypeople have been hired to work full time alongside the monks in the bakery. Seven varieties of bread are made. In addition to bread, the monks make biscotti and fruit and nut bars

The bread is sold at a store at the monastery, online, and in grocery stores in Buffalo, Rochester, and Syracuse.

Products are also sold wholesale to organizations who sell them for fundraising.

References

External links
 https://www.geneseeabbey.org/

Livingston County, New York
Trappistine monasteries in the United States